The Carioca Mosaic is a protected area mosaic in the state of Rio de Janeiro, Brazil.
It includes various federal, state and municipal conservation units in and around the city of Rio de Janeiro.

History

The Carioca Mosaic was created by ordnance 245 of 11 July 2011.
It included conservation units administered at the federal, state and municipal levels.
The federal Chico Mendes Institute for Biodiversity Conservation (ICMBio) administers the Tijuca National Park and Ilhas Cagarras Natural Monument.
The Rio de Janeiro State Secretariat for the Environment administers the Pedra Branca State Park, Gericinó/Mendanha and Sepetiba II environmental protection areas, and Guaratiba Biological Reserve.
The Rio de Janeiro Municipal Secretariat for the Environment administers 14 municipal nature parks, two environmental protection area and a natural monument.

The mosaic is coordinated at the federal level.
The consultative council includes administrators of the various protected areas and representatives of other public and private bodies.
The mosaic headquarters is at the headquarters of the Tijuca National Park.

Protected areas

Conservation units in the mosaic include:

Notes

Sources

Protected area mosaics of Brazil
Protected areas established in 2011
2011 establishments in Brazil
Protected areas of Rio de Janeiro (state)